Bernard Vifian (16 December 1944 – 18 June 2012) was a Swiss racing cyclist. He was the Swiss National Road Race champion in 1969. He also rode in the 1967 and 1970 Tour de France.

References

External links
 

1944 births
2012 deaths
Swiss male cyclists
Sportspeople from the canton of Geneva